George Edward Henry Skinner (26 June 1917 – 30 September 2002) was an English professional footballer who played for Tottenham Hotspur, Northfleet United, Gillingham, Brighton & Hove Albion and Hastings United.

Playing career
Skinner began his career at Callender's Cables works team, Callender's Athletic of the Spartan League. The inside forward signed for Tottenham Hotspur in May 1937 before joining the club's "nursery team" Northfleet United. Skinner signed professional forms with the Spurs in September 1938. At the onset of WW2 he joined the Royal Artillery and was a war time guest player at clubs including Charlton Athletic, Fulham, Harlepool, Middlesbrough, Swindon Town, York City and Bristol Rovers. Skinner made one senior appearance for the Lilywhites in a fixture versus Birmingham City in August 1946. After leaving White Hart Lane in July 1947 he had spells with Gillingham and Brighton & Hove Albion.

Coaching and management career
After gaining a full coaching badge from the Football Association in 1947, Skinner took up his first overseas post as an adviser to the Finland before taking up the position of player/coach at Hastings United. After four years with the South Coast club he became Kent FA chief coach before returning to Finland to take charge of the Finland Olympic team. Skinner returned to England as manager of Eastbourne Town from 1954 until 1959 and later held the post of chief coach of the Sussex FA.

In 1962 he travelled abroad to coach in Nigeria before becoming the national team coach of countries including Libya (1965), Jordan (1968) and Saudi Arabia (1969). He took the appointment of national coach with Frank O'Farrell of Iran in 1972. His last managerial position overseas was with Icelandic club IBV in 1976. Under his charge the club became the countries first club to progress past the first round of the UEFA Cup in 1978, after knocking out Glentoran. He retired from football in 1978 and settled in Pevensey Bay. He died on 30 September 2002 at an Eastbourne nursing home.

References

1917 births
2002 deaths
Military personnel from Kent
People from Pevensey
Footballers from Belvedere, London
English footballers
Association football inside forwards
Callender's Athletic F.C. players
Tottenham Hotspur F.C. players
Northfleet United F.C. players
Gillingham F.C. players
Brighton & Hove Albion F.C. players
Hastings United F.C. (1948) players
English Football League players
English football managers
Eastbourne Town F.C. managers
Íþróttabandalag Vestmannaeyja managers
Libya national football team managers
Jordan national football team managers
Saudi Arabia national football team managers
English expatriate football managers
English expatriate sportspeople in Libya
English expatriate sportspeople in Jordan
English expatriate sportspeople in Saudi Arabia
Expatriate football managers in Libya
Expatriate football managers in Jordan
Expatriate football managers in Saudi Arabia
British Army personnel of World War II
Royal Artillery personnel